John Francis William de Salis, 6th Count de Salis (*Neuchatel 25 August 1825 – †Hillingdon 7 August 1871) was a Count de Salis-Soglio, a British diplomat, and coin connoisseur.

Life 
He was the eldest son of Count Peter John de Salis by his second wife Cecile Henrietta Marguerite, daughter of David Bourgeoise of Neuchâtel.

After some education in London (Harrow) he was an Attaché in Turin (October 1845-December 1849).  Lived at Hillingdon.  He was a JP for Middlesex. In 1860 he was commissioned into the 24th Middlesex Volunteer Rifle Corps. He was promoted Lieutenant later that year and Captain in 1861.

A renowned numismatist, he is recorded on a large board as one of the British Museum's major benefactors. John Warren, 3rd Baron De Tabley was a first cousin, and William Fane De Salis an uncle.

He married (Iver, 1 February 1862) Amelia Frances Harriet (*London 1837- †8 January 1885), daughter of Christopher Tower, JP DL MP, of Huntsmoor Park, Iver and Weald Hall, Essex, by his wife Lady Sophia Cust (1811–1882), eldest daughter of the first Earl Brownlow.

In 1881 Burke's records the Countess at 7, Athlestone Terrace, Cromwell Road, London (where she died in 1885), and as at Grange Hill, Kilmallock, Ireland.

His brother Count Peter
Peter Fane de Salis (22 November 1827 – 27 March 1919), was a painter and engraver, notably of dogs. He was in the Austrian Service and then was curator of Neuchâtel's art museum.
He married firstly (1868) Adele L'Huillier (d. 27 March 1872) and secondly Agnes Louisa (d. 5 May 1916, ebendort), daughter of Charles Joseph La Trobe, CB, by his wife Sophie de Montmollin.

His surviving child, Elisabeth Sophie (Neufchatel, 21 May 1880 – 30 March 1967) married the long serving International Olympic Committee member Godefroy de Blonay.

His brother Count George
George Alois (1 December 1829 – 22 October 1866), was a captain in the 3rd (Archduke Charles) Lancer Regiment. Mortally wounded at the Battle of Custoza (1866) he was buried in Verona.

His sister
Anna Sophia Elisabeth, (28 July 1832 – 17 March 1916) married, at Neuchatel on 24 September 1858, a cousin Johann Gaudenz Dietegan (Freiherr) v. Salis-Seewis (4 December 1825- Chur 27 March 1886) of Bothmar, Malans. He was a grandson of the poet, lieder writer, and politician, Johann Gaudenz von Salis-Seewis (1762–1834). The younger Johann Gaudenz was a member of the Swiss parliament (Nationalrat in Bern) 1861-63 and represented Maienfeld in the Grossen Kantonalrats.
They had two daughters:
Anna Barbara Cäcilia (22 July 1859- ) married Dr. Paul Sprecher von Bernegg.
Helene Elisabeth (Chur 8 June 1863- ) married Friedrich von Tscharner, colonel, of Andermatt.

Children
Catherine Sophia (Katie) (29.1.1863-), John Francis Charles (1864-) and Henry Rodolph (Rudie) (1866-).

Katie married (24.7.1895) Thomas George Hare (1.9.1850-26.5.1915), of Harston, great-grandson of William Hare, 1st Earl of Listowel, they had two daughters, Adelaide Mary (1896-) and Frances Letitia (d.29.11.1919). Miss Hare (Adelaide) lived at: Cefn y Borth, Rhoscolyn, Holyhead, Anglesey, and then at: Bryn, Menai Bridge.

References

 Quadrennial di Fano Saliceorum, volume one, by R. de Salis, London, 2003.
 De Salis Family : English Branch, by Rachel Fane De Salis, Henley-on-Thames, 1934.
 Burke's Irish Family Records, ed. Hugh Montgomery-Massingberd, Burke's Peerage Ltd, London, 1976.
 A genealogical and heraldic History of the Colonial Gentry, by Sir (John) Bernard Burke, CB, LLD, vol. 2, London, 1895/1899 (pages 574–77).
 Burke's Peerage, Foreign Noblemen / Foreign Titles sections: 1851, 1936, 1956, etc.
 Debrett's Peerage, Foreign Titles section, 1920, etc.
 Der Grafliche Hauser, Band XI [volume 11], Genealogisches Handbuch Des Adels, C. A. Starke Verlag, Limburg an der Lahn, 1983 (pps 331–356).
 Armorial Families, a directory of Coat- Armour, compiled by Arthur Charles Fox-Davies, volume 1, 1929.
 Obituary in the Numismatic Chronicle 1872, pp. 10–12.
 John Allan, 'The early history of the Department of Coins and Medals', BM Quarterly, 1953, p. 76.

De Salis
De Salis
Numismatics
Volunteer Force officers in Middlesex units
De Salis
John Francis William
Salis
De Salis
De salis
Counts de Salis-Soglio and Comtes de Salis-Seewis
19th-century Irish landowners